Doris de Jong (1 February 1902 – 11 April 1991) was a Dutch épée, foil and sabre fencer. He competed at the 1928 and 1932 Summer Olympics.

References

External links
 

1902 births
1991 deaths
Dutch male épée fencers
Olympic fencers of the Netherlands
Fencers at the 1928 Summer Olympics
Fencers at the 1932 Summer Olympics
Fencers from Amsterdam
Dutch male foil fencers
Dutch male sabre fencers